A.J. Crew is an American Hip-Hop artist and producer, born and raised in Toledo, Ohio. He is known for his work with Skhye Hutch, Naledge (of Kidz in the Hall fame) and charitable efforts towards furthering Sickle Cell Anemia research. He previously attended Columbia College Chicago and Roosevelt University.

Early life
Crew was born July 1, 1990, in Toledo, Ohio and grew up on the South End of the city. He was raised by his mother, attended E.L. Bowsher High School and graduated in the year 2008. It was then that he decided to move to Chicago, Illinois, to pursue music. He was diagnosed with sickle cell disease at age 8.

Career
Crew started his career in 2009. Upon his arrival to Chicago, Illinois, he attended Columbia College Chicago where he met Austin Neely, and together they released a street album, "Nightmares & Daydreams". The album was released on September 1, 2009, via RubyHornet.com, Dope Couture and Soundscape Studios, with owner Michael Kolar serving as executive producer.  The Chicago Reader featured a review of said album with Miles Raymer writing, "...on the album in question, Crew shows a lot of potentials - he's got a talent for punch lines and a way of mixing long lyrical with short chopped lines."

In 2009, He worked with Grammy award-winning Rhymefest on "Destiny & Desire", a song from his first mixtape, "Nightmares & Daydreams".  On May 1, 2013, A.J. released "The Reality Of It All", The project features a collaboration with Naledge from the indie hip-hop duo, Kidz in the Hall, entitled, "Nah Mean?". In 2017, he was featured in The Thing I Am a hip-hop musical by Steve Bannon based on Shakespeare's Coriolanus and it was produced and realised by NowThis.

He was invited by Converse to record at OutKast’s legendary Stankonia Studios in Atlanta, Georgia as a part of their global Rubber Tracks initiative. One of the songs recorded during these sessions was "Vibes", a song that appears on his 2018 project "Excuses." The single was also released by Converse and Amoeba Music on 7" vinyls distributed at Amoeba Music in Hollywood, California during a show Crew performed at for the Converse Rubber Tracks campaign in 2016.

In 2018, he featured on Rafters by Clarence Clarity, the song was reviewed by Anthony Fantano of The Needle Drop.

Discography
Albums

Singles

Guest appearances

Mixtapes
 The Reality Of It All

EPs
 A

Production discography
 Demarco Castle - "XL (Excel)" ("On The Road To Glory: My Story")

Charity work
In February 2012, Crew launched a "Still Waiting" campaign to spread awareness and raise funds for Sickle Cell Anemia research and donated half of the proceeds from promotional single, "Still Waiting", to the Sickle Cell Disease Association of America. He was interviewed by The Torch about his charity work the same year.

References

External links

A.J. Crew interview, indepreneur.io

1990 births
Living people
American hip hop musicians
Record producers from Ohio
Musicians from Toledo, Ohio